Robert Degos (1904–1987) was a French dermatologist who described several dermatoses including Degos disease which he first described in a seminal paper published in 1942 in the French journal of dermatology and syphilology.

Life and work
He became an "interne des Hopitaux de Paris" in 1926 and trained at the Hopital Broca before joining the Hopital Saint-Louis in 1931 in the Department of another renown dermatologist, Gaston Auguste Milian. But it is Henri Gougerot in whose department he worked and trained in 1933 as "chef de clinique" - and who ultimately became his mentor - who influenced his choice of specializing in dermatology.

Degos became the "Chair in skin and syphilitic diseases" and chief of the first department of Dermatology at the Hopital Saint-Louis in 1951.

He was widely published including a classic textbook, Dermatologie, that was "the bible of all French Dermatologists for several decades and reflects the type of Dermatology Prof. Degos practiced, conceptualized and taught". Since its first publication in 1953, Dermatologie has undergone several editions and updates.

Key publications
Degos R, Delort J, and Tricot R. 1942. "Dermatite papulosquameuse atrophiante" Bulletin de la Société Française de Dermatologie et de Syphiligraphie 49: 148–150.
Degos, R. 1952. La Dermatologie. 4. éd. Les Petits Précis. Paris: Maloine.
Degos, R. 1953. Dermatologie. Collection Médico-chirurgicale à Révision Annuelle. Paris: Flammarion.

References

External links
Robert Degos @ Who Named It
Köhlmeier-Degos syndrome Who named it? 
Robert Degos @ Université Paris Descartes
ROBERT DEGOS (1904-1987), SA VIE, SON OEUVRE

French dermatologists
University of Paris alumni
1904 births
1987 deaths
20th-century French physicians